The molecular mass (m) is the mass of a given molecule: it is measured in daltons or atomic mass (Da or u). Different molecules of the same compound may have different molecular masses because they contain different isotopes of an element. The related quantity relative molecular mass, as defined by IUPAC, is the ratio of the mass of a molecule to the unified atomic mass unit (also known as the dalton) and is unitless. The molecular mass and relative molecular mass are distinct from but related to the molar mass. The molar mass is defined as the mass of a given substance divided by the amount of a substance and is expressed in g/mol. That makes the molar mass an average of many particles or molecules, and the molecular mass the mass of one specific particle or molecule. The molar mass is usually the more appropriate figure when dealing with macroscopic (weigh-able) quantities of a substance.

The definition of molecular weight is most authoritatively synonymous with relative molecular mass; however, in common practice, it is highly variable. When the molecular weight is used with the units Da or u, it is frequently as a weighted average similar to the molar mass but with different units. In molecular biology, the mass of macromolecules is referred to as their molecular weight and is expressed in kDa, although the numerical value is often approximate and representative of an average.

The terms molecular mass, molecular weight, and molar mass are often used interchangeably in areas of science where distinguishing between them is unhelpful. In other areas of science, the distinction is crucial. The molecular mass is more commonly used when referring to the mass of a single or specific well-defined molecule and less commonly than molecular weight when referring to a weighted average of a sample. Prior to the 2019 redefinition of SI base units quantities expressed in daltons (Da or u) were by definition numerically equivalent to otherwise identical quantities expressed in the units g/mol and were thus strictly numerically interchangeable. After the 20 May 2019 redefinition of units, this relationship is only nearly equivalent.

The molecular mass of small to medium size molecules, measured by mass spectrometry, can be used to determine the composition of elements in the molecule. The molecular masses of macromolecules, such as proteins, can also be determined by mass spectrometry; however, methods based on viscosity and light-scattering are also used to determine molecular mass when crystallographic or mass spectrometric data are not available.

Calculation 
Molecular masses are calculated from the atomic masses of each nuclide present in the molecule, while relative molecular masses are calculated from the standard atomic weights of each element. The standard atomic weight takes into account the isotopic distribution of the element in a given sample (usually assumed to be "normal"). For example, water has a relative molecular mass of 18.0153(3), but individual water molecules have molecular masses which range between 18.010 564 6863(15) Da (1H16O) and 22.027 7364(9) Da (2H18O).

Atomic and molecular masses are usually reported in daltons which is defined relative to the mass of the isotope 12C (carbon 12). Relative atomic and molecular mass values as defined are dimensionless. However, the "unit" Dalton is still used in common practice. For example, the relative molecular mass and molecular mass of methane, whose molecular formula is CH4, are calculated respectively as follows:

The uncertainty in molecular mass reflects variance (error) in measurement not the natural variance in isotopic abundances across the globe. In high-resolution mass spectrometry the mass isotopomers 12C1H4 and 13C1H4 are observed as distinct molecules, with molecular masses of approximately 16.031 Da and 17.035 Da, respectively. The intensity of the mass-spectrometry peaks is proportional to the isotopic abundances in the molecular species. 12C 2H 1H3 can also be observed with molecular mass of 17 Da.

Determination

Mass spectrometry 

In mass spectrometry, the molecular mass of a small molecule is usually reported as the monoisotopic mass, that is, the mass of the molecule containing only the most common isotope of each element. Note that this also differs subtly from the molecular mass in that the choice of isotopes is defined and thus is a single specific molecular mass of the many possibilities. The masses used to compute the monoisotopic molecular mass are found on a table of isotopic masses and are not found on a typical periodic table. The average molecular mass is often used for larger molecules since molecules with many atoms are unlikely to be composed exclusively of the most abundant isotope of each element. A theoretical average molecular mass can be calculated using the standard atomic weights found on a typical periodic table, since there is likely to be a statistical distribution of atoms representing the isotopes throughout the molecule. The average molecular mass of a sample, however, usually differs substantially from this since a single sample average is not the same as the average of many geographically distributed samples.

Mass photometry
Mass photometry (MP) is a rapid, in-solution, label-free method of obtaining the molecular mass of proteins, lipids, sugars & nucleic acids at the single-molecule level. The technique is based on interferometric scattered light microscopy. Contrast from scattered light by a single binding event at the interface between the protein solution and glass slide is detected and is linearly proportional to the mass of the molecule. This technique is also capable of measuring sample homogeneity, detecting protein oligomerisation state, characterisation of complex macromolecular assemblies (ribosomes, GroEL, AAV) and protein interactions such as protein-protein interactions. Mass photometry can measure molecular mass to an accurate degree over a wide range of molecular masses (40kDa – 5MDa).

Hydrodynamic methods 
To a first approximation, the basis for determination of molecular mass according to Mark–Houwink relations is the fact that the intrinsic viscosity of solutions (or suspensions) of macromolecules depends on volumetric proportion of the dispersed particles in a particular solvent. Specifically, the hydrodynamic size as related to molecular mass depends on a conversion factor, describing the shape of a particular molecule. This allows the apparent molecular mass to be described from a range of techniques sensitive to hydrodynamic effects, including DLS, SEC (also known as GPC when the eluent is an organic solvent), viscometry, and diffusion ordered nuclear magnetic resonance spectroscopy (DOSY). The apparent hydrodynamic size can then be used to approximate molecular mass using a series of macromolecule-specific standards. As this requires calibration, it's frequently described as a "relative" molecular mass determination method.

Static light scattering 
It is also possible to determine absolute molecular mass directly from light scattering, traditionally using the Zimm method. This can be accomplished either via classical static light scattering or via multi-angle light scattering detectors. Molecular masses determined by this method do not require calibration, hence the term "absolute". The only external measurement required is refractive index increment, which describes the change in refractive index with concentration.

See also 
 Cryoscopy and cryoscopic constant
 Ebullioscopy and ebullioscopic constant
 Dumas method of molecular weight determination
 François-Marie Raoult
 Standard atomic weight
 Mass number
 Absolute molar mass
 Molar mass distribution
 Dalton (unit)
 SDS-PAGE

References

External links 
 A Free Android application for molecular and reciprocal weight calculation of any chemical formula
 Stoichiometry Add-In for Microsoft Excel for calculation of molecular weights, reaction coefficients and stoichiometry.

Amount of substance
Mass